Prudent-Louis Leray, (29 August 1820 – 25 May 1879) was a French painter and lithographer.

Life 
Born in Couëron, Leray was the son of a famous doctor from Nantes who distinguished himself during the 1832 cholera pandemic. After studying as a scholarship student at the college in Nantes, Leray entered the city school of fine arts.

A pupil of Paul Delaroche, Leray exhibited for the first time at the Salon in 1848. Since then, his works have appeared with great success at all the annual Salons.

Gifted with a fine and delicate talent, Leray excelled at genre paintings, where coquetry and grace give a poetic character. Very meticulous in the details of his compositions, his canvases constitute a veritable museum of the costume of the Louis XV period, a period that he particularly liked.

He was 58 of age.

References

Further reading 
 .

External links 
 Commons category:Prudent-Louis Leray
 Prudent-Louis Leray on artnet.

19th-century French painters
19th-century French lithographers
19th-century French male artists
1820 births
1879 deaths
People from Loire-Atlantique